RCS MediaGroup S.p.A. (formerly Rizzoli-Corriere della Sera), based in Milan and listed on the Italian Stock Exchange, is an international multimedia publishing group that operates in daily newspapers, magazines and books, radio broadcasting, new media and digital and satellite TV. It is also one of the leading operators in the advertisement sales & distribution markets.

History
Founded in 1927 by entrepreneur Angelo Rizzoli as A. Rizzoli & C., it started in the press industry by buying out four national magazines, and later entering the publishing industry. Restructured and taken over a number of times, particularly in the 1980s when two of its executives became involved in the collapse of Banco Ambrosiano and the illegal Masonic Lodge Propaganda Due – or P2. Following the 1982 death of Roberto Calvi, the group applied for bankruptcy protection and greatly downsized.

In 2016, Cairo Communication acquired the controlling stake of RCS MediaGroup. In the same year, Italian Competition Authority approved the sales of RCS Libri ( Rizzoli Libri) from RCS MediaGroup to Arnoldo Mondadori Editore.

Timeline 

The timeline of the company:
1927 – Angelo Rizzoli launches publishing activities at his printing company “A. Rizzoli & C.”
1952 – company was renamed “Rizzoli Editore”
1974 – company purchased “Editoriale Corriere della Sera S.a.s.”, which publishes the daily newspaper Il Corriere della Sera
1976 – company took over management of La Gazzetta dello Sport
1984 – Gemina acquired controlling holding of Rizzoli
1990 – acquisition of holding in Spanish company Unidad Editorial S.A., the present day holding of which is 96.1%
1997 – Rizzoli-Corriere della Sera was separated from Gemina’s other industrial activities, which were transferred to the new holding company HdP
2000 – acquisition of French publishing house Editions Flammarion
2001 – creation of Fondazione Corriere della Sera
2002 – acquisition of holding in Dada S.p.A., which at present stands at 46.54%
2003 – company was renamed RCS MediaGroup
2006 – acquisition of first holding in Digicast, which is now a wholly owned subsidiary
2007 – acquisition, through Unidad Editorial, of Spanish publishing group Recoletos Grupo de Comunicaciòn
2007 – acquisition of 34.6% of Finelco Group
2008 – acquisition, through Unidad Editorial, of 100% of VEO Television (already held at 55,4%)
2012 – divestiture of Flammarion to Éditions Gallimard
2013 – In June 2013, the media group accepted an undisclosed offer from PRS S.r.l. to buy 14 magazines it had put up for sale as part of its restructuring plan. In July sold Dada S.p.A.
2014 – In September 2014, RCS MediaGroup in association with Playtech  launched an online sport betting portal under the brand GazzaBet.
2015 – Sold RCS Libri

Operations
RCS MediaGroup's sectors include newspapers, magazines and books, radio broadcasting, the internet and digital and satellite TV; it also has a division which handles advertising sales & distribution markets across all media divisions. In Italy, the group manages large daily newspapers such as Corriere della Sera, publish popular magazines including Il Mondo; and a diverse range of school, university, and business publications.

In Spain, through Unedisa it publishes leading daily newspaper El Mundo. It also has representation in Portugal, the United States and China. Already distributing the Italian version, in March 2008, RCS reached agreement with Global Media Publishing to launch a Russian version of its Sport Week magazine and develop a Russian language website sportweek.ru, which will be supplemented with mobile phone services.

The financial investment division holds interest in the capital of major Italian companies, including Banca Intesa, the internet company Dada, and Pirelli (which holds a complementary cross-holding).

The company employs 5,558 employees.

Sectors

Quotidiani (Newspapers) Sector
Quotidiani Sector is the publisher of the group's daily newspapers in Italy and in Spain. The company holds a leadership position in the national daily press in Italy, where it has a 19% market share, and in Spain, with an 18% market share.
Companies
RCS Sport, a company that organizes the most important cycling events in Italy, including the Giro d'Italia and some of the most prestigious Classics, such as the Milan–San Remo, the Giro di Lombardia and the Tirreno–Adriatico, together with other events linked to summer and winter sports. RCS Sport organises the Milan Marathon and manages the sponsorship rights for the Italy National Football Team. Since 2008, it has also been a partner of the Italy national rugby league team, and has entered the motorsport industry with the indoor supercross format, Superiders.
Unidad Editorial (96.48%, also present in the periodical sector), the leader in the daily press and in the on-line information sector through El Mundo, Expansión and Marca.
Newspapers
Corriere della Sera
Corriere dell'Alto Adige (local editions)
Corriere di Bergamo
Corriere di Bologna
Corriere di Brescia
Corriere Fiorentino
Corriere Milan
Corriere Rome
Corriere del Mezzogiorno
Corriere del Veneto
Corriere del Trentino
Corriere Turin
City
La Gazzetta dello Sport
El Mundo (in Spain through Unidad Editorial)
Marca (in Spain through Unidad Editorial)
Expansión (in Spain through Unidad Editorial)

Periodici (Magazines) Sector
Periodici Sector publishes the group's magazines. In Italy the company has a market share of about 18%, with a portfolio of more than 30 publications.
Companies
Sfera Editore
Pubblibaby
RCS Multimedia, a new integrated multimedia system that was launched in late 2008.
Digicast, a publisher of digital channels, distributed in Italy through SKY Italia.
Magazines

Abitare
 Amica
 Anna
Dolce Attesa
Dove
Io Donna
Io e il mio bambino
Insieme
Imagine
Italian Style
Living
OGGI

OGGI Cucino
 Sette
 Sport Week
 Style
 Style Piccoli
Actualidad Economica
Fuera De Serie
Metropoli
Telva
Yo Dona

Pubblicità (Advertising) Sector
Pubblicità Sector is the agency for the acquisition of advertising customers for the group's publications. It is the leading company in Italy for the acquisition of advertising for print media, for which it has a market share of 19%.
Companies
Blei, a media centre for the international market.
Unidad Editorial Publicidad
Novomedia

Other
 m-dis (45%)
Agenzia Giornalistica RCS, a news agency, which provides news and editorial content on radio, television and regional Italian web sites.

Former sectors
 
 RaiSat (5%)

RCS Libri

RCS Libri runs the group's activities in the book publishing sector. Its structure comprises four divisions: RCS Libri Italia, RCS Education, RCS Partworks, and Rizzoli USA. The whole division was sold to Arnoldo Mondadori Editore, with some imprints were sold to other investors. After the transaction, RCS Libri was renamed to Rizzoli Libri. It owned the rights to use the brand Rizzoli in book publishing only. The partworks division was sold in 2011.

Publishing houses

Adelphi Edizioni (sold to Roberto Calasso)
Archinto (sold to Rosellina Archinto)
Bompiani (sold to Mondadori; re-sold to Giunti Editore)
Etas (sold to Mondadori)
Fabbri Editori (sold to Mondadori)
Sonzogno
  (sold to Mondadori)

  (sold to Mondadori; re-sold to De Michelis family)
 (BUR; sold to Mondadori)
Skira (sold)
Rizzoli International Publications (sold to Mondadori)
 Rizzoli Bookstore
Universe
Rizzoli-Longanesi (50%, in joint venture with Mauri Spagnol Group)

Ownership
On 26 January 2005 shareholders which control 63.527% of ordinary share capital came to a shareholders' agreement freezing, the participants from selling or trading their holdings. On 14 March 2008 the pact agreed to extend their agreement for another three years until 2011. Italmobiliare, a company in the pact, acquired 2.332% stake of RCS from their subsidiary Italcementi in 2010, making the stake held by Italmobiliare increased to 7.465%. Italmobiliare did not excised all of their rights in the capital increase, making the company owned just 3.0042% of the share capital and 3.7469% ordinary shares of RCS.

In 2016 Urbano Cairo, via Cairo Communication, successfully completed a hostile takeover of RCS MediaGroup. However, Mediobanca, Unipol, Pirelli, Diego Della Valle and a private equity fund International Acquisitions Holding formed a new shareholders pact that opposed to Cairo; their offer to the public was lost to the offer from Cairo.

Earlier that year, Fiat Chrysler Automobiles (FCA), a company of the 2008 pact, distributed the shares of RCS the company owns (16.7% of the share capital), to the shareholders of FCA, making the shareholders of FCA freely decided to sell the shares of RCS to either factions or kept the shares as their own investments; Exor, the major shareholder of FCA, sold the stake of RCS immediately.

Major shareholders of RCS MediaGroup with >2% stake
As of 26 September 2016
 consortium of Cairo Communication and U.T. Communications (Urbano Cairo) 59.831%
 Mediobanca 9.930%
 consortium of Diego Della Valle & C. S.r.l. and DI. VI. Finanziaria di Diego Della Valle & C. S.r.l. (Diego Della Valle) 7.325%
 consortium of UnipolSai and Unipol (Finsoe) 4.601%
 Pirelli (State-owned Assets Supervision and Administration Commission of the State Council of China) 4.443%

References

External links
 
RCS MediaGroup profile at Business Week

 
Italian companies established in 1927
Television networks in Italy
Italian-language television networks
Mass media in Milan
Publishing companies established in 1927
Publishing companies of Italy
Book publishing companies of Italy